Phyllonorycter scitulella is a moth of the family Gracillariidae. It is found from the Czech Republic to Portugal, Italy and Greece and from France to Ukraine.

The larvae feed on Quercus pubescens. They mine the leaves of their host plant. They create a lower surface, tentiform mine, with one strong fold in the lower epidermis. Pupation takes place within the mine in a cocoon that is almost entirely covered with frass.

References

scitulella
Moths of Europe
Moths described in 1843